Madzikane Ka Zulu Memorial Hospital is a Provincial government funded hospital in Mount Frere in the Alfred Nzo District of the Eastern Cape province of South Africa. It is situated just a few kilometres north of Mount Frere town on the N2 road. It is a landmark in the area, being one of the largest hospitals in the province.

The hospital departments include Emergency department, Paediatric ward, Gynecology and Maternity ward, Out Patients Department (OPD), Surgical Services, Medical Services, Operating Theatre & CSSD Services, Laboratory, Pharmacy, Anti-Retroviral (ARV) treatment for HIV/AIDS, Post Trauma Counselling Services, Termination of Pregnancy Services, X-ray Services, Physiotherapy, Occupational Health Services, Laundry, Kitchen Services and Mortuary.

References 
Madzikane Ka Zulu Memorial Hospital

Hospitals in the Eastern Cape
Alfred Nzo District Municipality